Edgefield may refer to:

 Edgefield, Norfolk, United Kingdom

In the United States:
 Edgefield, Louisiana
 Edgefield, Ohio, an unincorporated community
 Multnomah County Poor Farm, Troutdale, Oregon, operated as a lodging and entertainment complex under the name McMenamins Edgefield
 Edgefield, South Carolina
 Edgefield County, South Carolina
 Edgefield (Renick, West Virginia), a historic house and farm complex